Theridiosoma genevensium, is a species of spider of the genus Theridiosoma. It is endemic to Sri Lanka.

See also
 List of Theridiosomatidae species

References

Theridiosomatidae
Endemic fauna of Sri Lanka
Spiders of Asia
Spiders described in 1972